Greek declension may refer to:
Declensions in Ancient Greek grammar 
Declensions in Modern Greek grammar